Jeffrey Jay Cohen (born June 22, 1965) is an American actor who has appeared in film and on television. Cohen's first feature film was in the 1985 film Paradise Motel. It was not until 1985, he would get his big role in the film Back to the Future as Skinhead, a member of Biff Tannen's gang. In 1989, he reprised his role in Back to the Future Part II, a year later, he appeared in Back to the Future Part III as a member of Needles' gang.

According to the DVD commentary, he was originally up for the role of Biff but did not appear physically intimidating when standing against the 6' 0½" Eric Stoltz who was originally cast as Marty McFly. Writer and producer Bob Gale noted that, had the much shorter Michael J. Fox been cast as Marty from the beginning as they had hoped, Cohen probably would have played Biff.

Cohen's other film roles include the 1985 film Secret Admirer. He starred in the 1986 drama film Fire with Fire. Cohen's other big role was in the 1987 action film The Principal as White Zac. He also appeared in the 1988 horror film 976-EVIL. Cohen's most recent film was in the 2000 film Almost Famous.

Cohen has appeared in television series, including V: The Series, Baywatch, Amazing Stories (The Mission), Pacific Blue and Providence.

Selected filmography
 1985 Paradise Motel as "Shooter" Spinelli
 1985 Secret Admirer as Barry
 1985 Back to the Future as Joey "Skinhead" Unger
 1986 Fire with Fire as Myron, The Mapmaker 
 1987 The Principal as Zac "White Zac"
 1987 Daddy as Dewey
 1988 976-EVIL as Marcus
 1989 Back to the Future Part II as Joey "Skinhead" Unger
 1990 Back to the Future Part III as Needles' Gang Member
 1994 Object of Obsession as Homeless Man
 1998 The Night Caller as Bicyclist
 2000 Almost Famous as Scully, The Roadie

References

External links
 
 

1965 births
American male film actors
American male television actors
Living people
Place of birth missing (living people)